Mainhardt is a municipality in the district of Schwäbisch Hall in Baden-Württemberg in Germany.

See also
 Mainhardt Forest

References

Schwäbisch Hall (district)